KF Aerospace is an approved maintenance organization (AMO) which operates two maintenance, repair and overhaul (MRO) facilities in Canada, one at Kelowna International Airport in British Columbia and the other at Hamilton International Airport in Ontario. It is the parent company of KF Cargo, which provides cargo aircraft charter and leasing services, and  KF Defence Programs, contract operator of the Canadian Forces Contracted Flying Training and Support program. KF Aerospace is Kelowna's largest private employer.

History

The company was established as Kelowna Flightcraft on March 20, 1970 and the charter subsidiary Kelowna Flightcraft Air Charter was established and started operating in June 1974. It is wholly owned by Barry Lapointe Holding.

In 1996, Kelowna Flightcraft was operating Boeing 727-200 jets in scheduled passenger airline service on a contract basis for Greyhound Air, a Canadian-based new startup air carrier.

Flightcraft's extensive history in maintenance work directed to the ubiquitous Boeing 727 "feederliner" series has led to their adaptation as the main type for cargo operations, with Purolator Courier their main client.  It was announced on February 19, 2014 that Flightcraft lost their contract with Purolator Courier as another carrier, Cargojet, won the contract.

On March 30, 2005, KF Aerospace was awarded a $1.77 billion contract to lead a team of Canadian companies called KF Defence Programs to provide primary flight training for the Canadian Forces Air Command at Southport at the former CFB Base Portage la Prairie, Manitoba.

KF Aerospace also undertakes maintenance and upgrades on the Convair CV-240 family, for which it owns the type certificate. KF Aerospace converts existing Convair CV-580s to the updated CV5800 configuration and provides conversions of the former Canadian Forces CC-109 Cosmopolitan transport fleet into freighters and "fire-fighting" water/chemical bombers.

In September 2020 the organization announced plans to build a $25 million aerospace museum, hangar and conference center in Kelowna. The 50,000 sqft facility was designed by Meiklejohn Architects and built by Sawchuk Developments Co. Completed and opened in 2022, it is shaped like a plane and features a mass timber and steel design. The two hangars house legacy aircraft such as a World War II Mosquito fighter-bomber and a Hawker Tempest MKII.

KF Aerospace announced a partnership with Boeing to open two conversion lines for 737-800BCF at its Kelowna facility in 2023. The company adds two hangars at that facility.

KF works with WestJet, WestJet Encore, Swoop, Sunwing, and Air Transat.

Aircraft

KF offers leasing of the following aircraft types:

Boeing 737 300/400
Convair 580
 
KF offers maintenance for the following aircraft types:

Boeing 727 100/200
Boeing 737 100/200 300/400/500 600
/700/800/900 Max
Boeing 757 200/300
Boeing 767 200/300/300ER
Airbus A300
Airbus A310
Airbus A319/A320/A321
Bombardier CRJ100/200
de Havilland Canada DHC-8 Dash 8
Embraer E-Jet
McDonnell Douglas DC-10
Douglas DC-3/4/6/8/9
McDonnell Douglas MD-80
Lockheed L382
Convair 580
ATR42
ATR72
Beechcraft Premier
Beechcraft King Air

References

External links
 KF Aerospace

Aerospace companies of Canada
Companies based in Kelowna